The Irish International Exhibition (sometimes Dublin International) was a world's fair held in Dublin in 1907, when all of Ireland was still part of the United Kingdom.

Summary

The decision to hold the exhibition was taken at the Irish Industrial Conference in April 1903, and inspired by a small exhibition in Cork (the Cork International Exhibition) 5 years earlier. The 1907 exhibition was intended to improve the trade of Irish goods.
The leading force behind the project was William Martin Murphy, a businessman and owner of the Irish Independent, Clerys department store (Clery & Co.), the Dublin United Transport Company and several other Irish and overseas ventures. Other organisers included the Irish journalist William Francis Dennehy.

The exposition ran from 4 May to 9 November 1907,
received 2.75 million visitors covered 52 acres and made a loss of about £100 000 sterling, although this was underwritten by guarantors.

As well as contributions from countries including Canada, France and New Zealand there were displays of motor cars, electric and gas lighting and machinery; fine art displays including work by Eva Henrietta Hamilton; funfair amusements; a display depicting life in British Somaliland, the 'Somali village', was the exhibition's most popular attraction.

Legacy
The land used for the exhibition became Herbert Park, where remaining artifacts include a bandstand and pond.

Notables
There was a separation of Irish and British pavilions at a time when desire for Home Rule for Ireland was becoming more vocal, and some years before a declaration of independence and the eventual secession of the Irish Free State from the United Kingdom.

See also
 Great Industrial Exhibition (1853)
 Colonial exhibitions
 International Exhibition of Arts and Manufactures

References

Sources
 

 Dennehy, William F. Record - The Irish International Exhibition 1907 Hely's Limited, Dublin 1909. 354 pp.

World's fairs in Dublin (city)
1907 in Ireland
History of Dublin (city)
Culture in Dublin (city)
1900s in Dublin (city)